The twelfth edition of the Johan Cruyff Shield was held on 11 August 2007 between 2006–07 Eredivisie champions PSV Eindhoven and 2006–07 KNVB Cup winners Ajax. Ajax won the match 1–0.

Match details

 

2007
Joh
j
j
Johan Cruyff Shield